Bloodrocuted was a Belgian metal band, mixing the speed of thrash metal with the brutality and aggressiveness of death metal.

History 
At age 13 Bloodrocuted was founded in a basement in Brussels by Daan Swinnen and Bob Briessinck. After a short period of time Jason Bond and Gaetan de Vos (now deceased) joined the band. The band started recording their first album Doomed to Annihilation.

What followed was a long series of shows throughout Belgium, Germany and the Netherlands supporting the bands Skeletonwitch, Havok and Melechesh.

In 2015 Bloodrocuted released their follow-up album Disaster Strikes Back. The band expanded its horizons by incorporating Teutonic thrash, blast beats and death metal vocals. To promote this album they toured Europe alongside Suicidal Angels, Dr. Living Dead! and Angelus Apatrida.

Shortly after this tour drummer Gaetan de Vos quit the band due to other interests, and Deserter drummer Sander Vogt Joined the band. Bloodrocuted went on tour in the United Kingdom, played the mainstage of Antwerp metal fest, supported bands like Nervosa, Enthroned, and Voivod and played the prestigious Metaldays festival in Slovenia.

After two years of intensive touring and playing, Briessinck and Vogt decided to quit in 2016 to explore other pursuits. Quickly after this news, Ben Van Peteghem and Dennis Wyffels were introduced into the band. They started recording their third album "For the Dead Travel Fast" which has been released on the 1st of April 2017. This release was followed with a tour across Europe together with Nargaroth, Absu, Hate and Nekrodelirium.

Members

Current members 
 Daan Swinnen - vocals and bass
 Jason Bond - guitar and backing vocals
 Dennis Wyffels - guitar and backing vocals
 Ben Van Peteghem - drums

Former members 
 Bob Briessinck - guitar and vocals (2010-2016)
 Sander Vogt - drums (2015-2016)
 Gaëtan De Vos - drums (2012-2015)

Discography

References

External links 
 Official website

Belgian heavy metal musical groups
Musical quartets